The Kettle Moraine 100 is an ultramarathon held annually in early June in Kettle Moraine State Forest near La Grange, WI. The event includes a 100-mile race, a 100km race, and a 38-mile night "fun run."

Course Description
The 100-mile race consists of two out and back legs with the first round trip distance being 62.9 miles and the second being 37.3 miles. The 100km race follows the first 62.9 miles of the 100-mile race and the 38-mile night "fun run" follows the last 37.3 miles. Runners registered for the 100-mile race may drop at the 100km finish. 

The 100-mile course is run entirely on trails (except for a couple hundred feet of road crossings) and traverses the Ice Age Trail for about 65 miles. The trail is about 80% wooded terrain with the rest meandering through gentle prairie or marsh areas. Despite the low elevation, there is a roller coaster of hills that amount to a total altitude gain of approximately 8,800 feet. There is a 30-hour time cutoff to complete the race, with cutoffs at 3 aid stations along the course. There are 21 staffed aid stations along the course, as well as 8 unstaffed aid stations that have water and limited runner aid.

Course Records

References

External links
Official web site
Metzger, Bob "Feeling Blessed at the Kettle Moraine 100, chapter in Running Through the Wall: Personal Encounters with the Ultramarathon By Neal JamisonBreakaway Books (April 1, 2003) 

Ultramarathons in the United States